Bestyakhsky Rural Okrug is a rural okrug (administrative division) of Khangalassky District in the Sakha Republic, Russia. 
It contains just two settlements: Bestyakh (its administrative center) and Charang.

References

Rural localities in Khangalassky District